The following is a list of notable deaths in June 2022.

Entries for each day are listed alphabetically by surname. A typical entry lists information in the following sequence:
 Name, age, country of citizenship at birth, subsequent country of citizenship (if applicable), reason for notability, cause of death (if known), and reference.

June 2022

1
Syed Ahmad Syed Abu Bakar, 76, Malaysian footballer (Johor, Penang, national team), prostate cancer.
Marion Barber III, 38, American football player (Dallas Cowboys, Chicago Bears), heat stroke.
Yadunath Baskey, 95, Indian politician.
Aleksandr Berketov, 46, Russian footballer (Rotor Volgograd, CSKA Moscow).
Sir Gerard Brennan, 94, Australian lawyer and jurist, Justice (1981–1995) and Chief Justice (1995–1998) of the High Court.
Oris Buckner, 70, American police detective and whistleblower.
Peter Daley, 71, American politician, member of the Pennsylvania House of Representatives (1983–2016).
Serge Diantantu, 62, Congolese comic book artist.
Anthony Drake, 81, English teacher, designer of the flag of Saskatchewan.
Ilia Eloshvili, 47, Georgian politician, minister of energy (2016, 2017).
Andrée Geulen, 100, Belgian philanthropist.
Charles Kernaghan, 74, American human rights, anti-corporation and worker's rights activist.
Jean Lèques, 90, New Caledonian politician, president of the Government of New Caledonia (1999–2001) and mayor of Nouméa (1986–2014).
James M. Lewis, 78, American politician, member of the Tennessee Senate (1986–1990).
John Lloyd, 77, Australian footballer (Carlton), cancer.
Lu Feng, 95, Chinese politician.
Frank Manumaleuga, 66, American football player (Kansas City Chiefs).
Paulo Antonino Mascarenhas Roxo, 93, Brazilian Roman Catholic prelate, bishop of Mogi das Cruzes (1989–2004).
Carman McClelland, 70, Canadian politician and lawyer, Ontario MPP (1987–1995).
Salvador Elá Nseng, 82, Equatorial Guinean military leader and politician, vice president (1979–1980).
Richard Oldcorn, 84, English Olympic fencer (1964, 1968, 1972).
May Routh, 87, British-American costume designer (The Man Who Fell to Earth, Splash, Being There).
Mark Schaeffer, 73, American baseball player (San Diego Padres).
Shelby Scott, 86, American television journalist (KIRO-TV, WBZ-TV) and union president (AFTRA).
Barry Sussman, 87, American newspaper editor (The Washington Post), gastrointestinal bleeding.
István Szőke, 75, Hungarian footballer (Ferencváros, national team), stroke.
Takeyoshi Tanuma, 93, Japanese photographer.
Leroy Williams, 85, American jazz drummer.
Joseph Zoderer, 86, Italian writer.
Jorge Zuloaga, 100, Colombian comedian, actor (The Strategy of the Snail) and reporter.

2
Ken Bode, 83, American journalist (Washington Week).
Kai Bumann, 61, German-Polish conductor and teacher (Warsaw Chamber Opera, Polish Baltic Philharmonic), heart attack.
Joyce Burditt, 83, American television writer (Diagnosis: Murder, Matlock, Father Dowling Mysteries).
Hal Bynum, 87, American songwriter ("Lucille", "Chains", "Papa Was a Good Man"), complications from a stroke and Alzheimer's disease.
Paul Coppo, 83, American Olympic ice hockey player (1964).
Kay Dalton, 90, American football coach (Montreal Alouettes, Kansas City Chiefs, Denver Broncos).
Andrey Gaponov-Grekhov, 95, Russian physicist.
Nobuyuki Idei, 84, Japanese businessman (Sony Corporation), liver failure.
Agneta Klingspor, 76, Swedish author.
Marta Lafuente, 54, Paraguayan psychologist and politician.
Gonzalo Lopez, 46, American fugitive and mass murderer, shot.
José Luccioni, 72, French actor (Like a Pot of Strawberries).
Gracia Montes, 86, Spanish copla singer.
Valentin Oehen, 91, Swiss politician, MP (1971–1987).
Charles L. Peterson, 95, American painter.
Anatoly Pokrovsky, 91, Russian vascular surgeon.
Bhajan Sopori, 73, Indian santoor player, colon cancer.
Carl Stiner, 85, American military officer, commander of USSOCOM (1990–1993).
Berndt Stübner, 75, German actor (Wedding Night in the Rain), playwright and theatre director.
James Ronald Walker, 74, American politician, member of the Georgia State Senate (1977–1984).
Uri Zohar, 86, Israeli film director (Hole in the Moon, Three Days and a Child, Bloomfield) and rabbi.

3
José de Abreu, 77, Brazilian businessman and politician, deputy (1995–2003).
Robert L. Backman, 100, American politician, member of the Utah House of Representatives (1971–1975).
Saafi Boulbaba, 36, Tunisian footballer (Espérance Sportive de Tunis, A S Kasserine, MC El Eulma), traffic collision.
Piergiorgio Bressani, 92, Italian politician, deputy (1963–1986), and mayor of Udine (1985–1990).
Raymond Chabanne, 98, French military officer.
Frank Clarke, 79, English footballer (Shrewsbury Town, Queens Park Rangers, Carlisle United).
Ann Turner Cook, 95, American author and model (Gerber Baby).
Liliana de Curtis, 89, Italian actress (Orient Express) and writer.
El Noba, 25, Argentine cumbia singer, injuries from traffic collision.
Christopher Evans-Ironside, 82, English-German songwriter, composer and music producer.
Sophie Freud, 97, Austrian psychologist, pancreatic cancer.
Kari Frisell, 99, Norwegian operatic soprano and pedagogue.
Raffaele Ganci, 90, Italian mobster, heart attack.
Geoff Hunter, 62, English footballer (Crewe Alexandra, Port Vale, Wrexham).
Hypo, 39, British rapper, stabbed.
Ken Kelly, 76, American fantasy artist and album cover designer (Kiss, Rainbow, Manowar).
Ra'anan Levy, 68, French-Israeli artist.
Alexander Madiebo, 90, Nigerian soldier, chief of army staff of the Biafran Armed Forces.
David Matravers, 84, South African cosmologist.
Grachan Moncur III, 85, American jazz trombonist, cardiac arrest.
Shinjiro Ono, 74, Japanese patent attorney.
Tony Pajaczkowski, 86, Canadian football player (Calgary Stampeders, Montreal Alouettes).
John Porter, 87, American politician, member of the Illinois House of Representatives (1973–1979) and U.S. House of Representatives (1980–2001).
John Pier Roemer, 68, American jurist, judge on the Wisconsin circuit courts (2004–2017), shot.
Roger Scholes, 71, Australian film and television director, writer (The Tale of Ruby Rose) and cinematographer.
Dorothy E. Smith, 95, British-born Canadian sociologist.
Anna Maria Tatò, 82, Italian film director (The Night and the Moment, Marcello Mastroianni: I Remember).
Jack Weisgerber, 81, Canadian politician and businessman, British Columbia MLA (1986–2001).
Adam Wolańczyk, 86, Polish actor (Johnnie Waterman, Pan Tadeusz).

4
John Berks, 80, South African radio presenter.
John Cooksey, 80, American ophthalmologist and politician, member of the U.S. House of Representatives (1997–2003).
Ismail Daut, 66, Malaysian politician, MP (2013–2018), fall.
Fei Liang, 85–86, Chinese herpetologist.
Prayar Gopalakrishnan, 72, Indian politician, Kerala MLA (2001–2006), heart attack.
Frank Hoffmann, 83, German-Austrian actor (Ace of Aces, Derrick).
Hu Fa-kuang, 98, Hong Kong businessman and politician, member of the Legislative Council (1979–1988).
Sherry Huber, 84, American environmentalist and politician, member of the Maine House of Representatives (1976–1982).
Hajime Ishii, 87, Japanese politician, minister of home affairs (1994) and MP (1969–1983, 1986–2005), heart failure.
Dmitry Kovtun, 56, Russian intelligence officer, COVID-19.
George Lamming, 94, Barbadian novelist (In the Castle of My Skin) and poet.
Joyce C. Lashof, 96, American physician.
Robert Laurie, 66, Australian rugby league player (Eastern Suburbs, South Sydney Rabbitohs, New South Wales).
Beryl J. Levine, 86, Canadian-born American judge, justice on the North Dakota Supreme Court (1985–1996).
Nate Miller, 34, American basketball player (Ironi Nahariya, Ironi Ramat Gan, Incheon ET Land Elephants).
György Moldova, 88, Hungarian writer.
Ivan Mosyakin, 74, Russian politician, MP (2003–2007).
Eric Nesterenko, 88, Canadian ice hockey player (Chicago Blackhawks, Toronto Maple Leafs) and actor (Youngblood), Stanley Cup champion (1961).
Sir David Nicholas, 92, British broadcast journalist, ITN editor and chief executive (1977–1989).
Mike Omotosho, Nigerian politician.
Donald Pelletier, 90, American Roman Catholic prelate, bishop of Morondava (1999–2010).
Marc Pessin, 89, French engraver, editor, and illustrator.
Thubten Samphel, 65, Tibetan writer and government official.
Goran Sankovič, 42, Slovenian footballer (SK Slavia Prague, Panionios, national team).
Skull Duggery, 51, American rapper (These Wicked Streets).
Robert Stewart, 55, American football player (Charlotte Rage, New Jersey Red Dogs, Carolina Cobras).
Alec John Such, 70, American Hall of Fame bassist (Bon Jovi).
Veryl Switzer, 89, American football player (Green Bay Packers, Calgary Stampeders, Montreal Alouettes).
Neila Tavares, 73, Brazilian actress (Vai Trabalhar, Vagabundo!), journalist and television presenter.
Bolesław Tejkowski, 88, Polish politician, sociologist and engineer.
Tomás Várnagy, 71, Argentine philosopher.
Mubarak Al-Zwair, 94–95, Kuwaiti politician, MP (1985–1986).

5
Haidar Abdul-Razzaq, 39, Iraqi footballer (Al-Ittihad, Sulaymaniya, national team), blunt force trauma.
Sumana Amarasinghe, 74, Sri Lankan actress (Dahasak Sithuvili, Binaramalee, Kadawunu Poronduwa), costume designer and film producer.
Peter Ascherl, 68, Canadian-German ice hockey player (Mannheim ERC, Düsseldorfer EG).
Giuseppe Azzaro, 96, Italian lawyer and politician, deputy (1963–1992), mayor of Catania (1987–1988, 1991).
John Bates, 87, British fashion designer, cancer.
Stanley Goreraza, Zimbabwean military officer, cancer.
Shaun Greatbatch, 52, English darts player.
Alma Rosa Hernández Escobar, 65, Mexican politician, deputy (since 2021).
Richard Edwin Hills, 76, British astronomer.
Roman Kutuzov, 53, Russian major general.
Edwin M. Leidel Jr., 83, American Episcopal prelate, bishop of Eastern Michigan (1996–2006), cancer.
Alex Magaisa, 46, Zimbabwean academic and political advisor.
Garnik Mehrabian, 84, Iranian football player (Taj, national team) and manager (Machine Sazi).
Aleksandr Nikitin, 87, Russian chess player, theorist and coach.
Oddleif Olavsen, 76, Norwegian footballer (Bodø/Glimt) and politician, mayor of Bodø (1995–1999).
Bruno Pereira, 41, Brazilian indigenist, shot.
Dom Phillips, 57, British journalist, shot.
Christopher Pratt, 86, Canadian painter and printmaker, designer of the flag of Newfoundland and Labrador.
Eldon Rasmussen, 85, Canadian Hall of Fame racing driver.
Berit Stensønes, 66, Norwegian mathematician.
Roger Swinfen Eady, 3rd Baron Swinfen, 83, British politician and philanthropist, member of the House of Lords (since 1977).
Trouble, 34, American rapper, shot.
Roberto Wirth, 72, Italian hotelier, heart attack.

6
Isabel Álvarez, 88, Cuban baseball player (Chicago Colleens, Fort Wayne Daisies, Kalamazoo Lassies).
Brother Jed, 79, American evangelist.
Gianni Clerici, 91, Italian tennis commentator and journalist.
Florence d'Harcourt, 93, French politician, deputy (1978–1988).
Jacques Destoop, 90, French painter and actor (Bye bye, Barbara).
Zeta Emilianidou, 67, Cypriot lawyer and politician, minister of labour and social insurance (since 2013), complications from ruptured brain aneurysm.
Juliette de La Genière, 94, French archaeologist.
Helen Hodgman, 77, Scottish-born Australian novelist.
David Hughes, 80, British astronomer.
William Hutton, 93, Canadian politician, member of the Metropolitan Corporation of Greater Winnipeg (1969–1971).
Keijo Korhonen, 88, Finnish diplomat and politician, minister for foreign affairs (1976–1977).
Lee Hui-seong, 97, South Korean military officer and politician, minister of transport (1982–1983).
Séamus Looney, 72, Irish hurler and Gaelic footballer (UCC GAA, Cork GAA).
Ruth B. Love, 90, American school superintendent.
Orlando Jorge Mera, 55, Dominican lawyer and politician, minister of environment and natural resources (since 2020), shot.
A. L. Mestel, 95, American pediatric surgeon and visual artist.
Edward C. Oliver, 92, American politician, member of the Minnesota Senate (1993–2002).
John Pangkey, 72, Indonesian military officer and politician, member of the West Kalimantan Regional People's Representative Council (1999–2004).
Zinovy Roizman, 80, Russian film and animation director and screenwriter (Empire Under Attack).
Valery Ryumin, 82, Russian cosmonaut (Soyuz 25, Soyuz 32, Soyuz 35).
Michele Scandiffio, 93, Italian Roman Catholic prelate, archbishop of Acerenza (1988–2005).
Jim Seals, 79, American musician (Seals and Crofts, The Champs) and songwriter ("Summer Breeze").
William J. Sullivan, 83, American judge, member (1999–2009) and chief justice of the Connecticut Supreme Court (2001–2006).
Yves-Marie Vérove, 72, French basketball player (AS Berck, Caen, Étendard de Brest) and coach.
Jacques Villeglé, 96, French mixed-media artist.
Wong Chun Hin, 26, Hong Kong footballer (Eastern, Wong Tai Sin, Lee Man), fall.

7
Robert Alexander, 64, American football player (Los Angeles Rams).
Isaac Berger, 85, American weightlifter, Olympic champion (1956).
Carl, Duke of Württemberg, 85, German royal, head of the House of Württemberg (since 1975).
Frank Cipriani, 81, American baseball player (Kansas City Athletics).
Anne Cutler, 77, Australian psycholinguist, director emeritus of the Max Planck Institute for Psycholinguistics.
Tommy Dysart, 86, Scottish-born Australian actor (Prisoner, The Man from Snowy River, Flynn).
Trudy Haynes, 95, American journalist (WXYZ-TV, KYW-TV).
Marco Luzzago, 71, Italian aristocrat, lieutenant of the Sovereign Military Order of Malta (since 2020), heart attack.
Jean-Louis Schefer, 83, French art historian.
Erasmus Schöfer, 91, German writer.
Raivo Trass, 76, Estonian actor (Viimne reliikvia, Vana daami visiit, Tangerines), stage director and theatrical pedagogue.
Robert M. Utley, 92, American author and historian.
Freddy Vias, 92, Malaysian Olympic field hockey player (1956).
Zain-ud-Din bin Abdul Wahab, 74, Malaysian Olympic sprinter (1972), respiratory disease.
Zhou Qinzhi, 94, Chinese engineer, member of the Chinese Academy of Engineering.

8
Aurora Altisent, 93, Spanish painter, drafter, and sculptor.
Elios Andreini, 81, Italian politician.
Bernhard Casper, 91, German philosopher.
Louis Crocq, 94, French military doctor and psychiatrist.
Costică Dafinoiu, 68, Romanian boxer, Olympic bronze medallist (1976).
Clive Doyle, 81, Australian Branch Davidian (Waco siege), pancreatic cancer.
Tarhan Erdem, 89, Turkish politician, deputy (1977–1980) and minister of industry and technology (1977).
Mladen Frančić, 67, Croatian football player and manager (Vrbovec, Podravina, Al-Watani Club).
Rocky Freitas, 76, American football player (Detroit Lions, Tampa Bay Buccaneers).
Revel Guest, 90, British filmmaker, journalist and author.
Richard P. Harmond, 93, American historian and author.
Julio Jiménez, 87, Spanish road racing cyclist, traffic collision.
Dale W. Jorgenson, 89, American economist.
Bruce Kent, 92, British Roman Catholic priest and activist (Campaign for Nuclear Disarmament).
Myron Kowalsky, 80, Canadian politician, Saskatchewan MLA (1986–2007) and speaker (2001–2007).
Lan Tianye, 95, Chinese actor (The Investiture of the Gods).
David Lloyd-Jones, 87, British conductor.
Ranan Lurie, 90, Egyptian-born Israeli-American political cartoonist and journalist.
Christof May, 49, German theologian and priest (diocese of Limburg), suicide.
Fernando Pinto Monteiro, 80, Portuguese jurist, attorney general (2006–2012), cancer.
Romeo Morri, 70, Sammarinese politician and writer, captain regent (1992–1993) and member of the Grand and General Council (1983–2012).
Birkha Bahadur Muringla, 79, Indian writer.
Carmen Pedrosa, 80, Filipino journalist.
Dame Paula Rego, 87, Portuguese-British visual artist.
Wolfgang Reisinger, 66, Austrian jazz percussionist, ruptured aneurysm.
Andrey Shumilin, 52, Russian Olympic wrestler (1996).
Song Hae, 95, South Korean television host (Korea Sings) and singer.
George Thompson, 74, American basketball player (Memphis Tams, Milwaukee Bucks), complications from diabetes.
Joe Vinen, 92, British physicist (quantization of superfluid vorticity, quantum turbulence).
Vladimir Yegorov, 83, Russian politician, governor of Kaliningrad Oblast (2001–2005).

9
Mark Shandii Bacolod, 37, Filipino film director (Fidel, Ben & Sam) and producer (Culion).
Billy Bingham, 90, Northern Irish football player (Sunderland, national team) and manager (Plymouth Argyle).
Aloísio Sinésio Bohn, 87, Brazilian Roman Catholic prelate, bishop of Novo Hamburgo (1980–1986) and Santa Cruz do Sul (1986–2010).
Giuseppe Brizi, 80, Italian football player (Maceratese, Fiorentina) and manager (Fermana).
Commander Tom, 59, German DJ and record producer.
Julee Cruise, 65, American singer ("Falling", "If I Survive"), musician and actress (Twin Peaks), suicide.
Ron Farmer, 86, Guernsey footballer (Nottingham Forest, Coventry City, Notts County).
Dan Goldstein, 67, Romanian-born Israeli entrepreneur, co-founder of Formula Systems.
James C. Hayes, 76, American politician, mayor of Fairbanks, Alaska (1992–2001), first African-American mayor in Alaska.
Fumihiro Himori, 73, Japanese politician, MP (2000–2003, 2005–2009).
Aamir Liaquat Hussain, 50, Pakistani journalist and politician, MNA (2002–2007, since 2018).
Billy Kametz, 35, American voice actor (JoJo's Bizarre Adventure, Pokémon, Attack on Titan), colon cancer.
Maxine Kline, 92, American baseball player (Fort Wayne Daisies).
Biruta Lewaszkiewicz-Petrykowska, 94, Polish lawyer, judge of the Constitutional Tribunal (1997–2006).
Oleg Moliboga, 69, Russian volleyball player and coach, Olympic champion (1980).
Chris Nangoi, Papua New Guinean politician, MP (since 2017).
Peter Neale, 88, English footballer (Oldham Athletic, Scunthorpe United, Chesterfield). (death announced on this date)
Ladislav Olejník, 90, Czech ice hockey player (HC Kometa Brno) and coach (EC Bad Nauheim).
Don Perkins, 84, American football player (Dallas Cowboys).
Shauneille Perry, 92, American stage director and playwright.
Donald Pippin, 95, American theatre musical director, Tony winner (1963).
Rekandar Nageswara Rao, 73, Indian actor and stage director.
Thurman D. Rodgers, 87, American military information and communications officer, oversaw installation of MSE for military.
Gordon M. Shepherd, 88, American neuroscientist.
Ronni Solbert, 96, American artist, photographer and illustrator (The Pushcart War).
Eva Steininger-Bludau, 70, German politician, member of the Landtag of North Rhine-Westphalia (2010–2017).
Ewonne Winblad, 85, Swedish journalist.
Matt Zimmerman, 87, Canadian-British actor (Thunderbirds, A Man for All Seasons, Haunted Honeymoon).
Zou Jing, 86, Chinese engineer, member of the Chinese Academy of Engineering.

10
Jean-Jacques Barthe, 85, French politician, deputy (1973–1988), mayor of Calais (1971–2000).
Billel Benhammouda, 24, Algerian footballer (USMM Hadjout, USM Alger), traffic collision.
Baxter Black, 77, American cowboy poet and veterinarian.
Stuart Carlson, 66, American editorial cartoonist (Milwaukee Journal Sentinel).
Oleksiy Chubashev, 31, Ukrainian military journalist, shot.
Zoltán Dörnyei, 62, Hungarian-born British linguist.
Harry Gesner, 97, American architect, complications from cancer.
Viliami Hingano, 47, Tongan politician, MP (2014–2017, since 2021), governor of Haʻapai (2021).
Bobby Hope, 78, Scottish football player (West Bromwich Albion, national team) and manager (Bromsgrove Rovers).
George Izo, 84, American football player (Washington Redskins, Detroit Lions, Pittsburgh Steelers).
Vladimir Kuzyutkin, 74, Russian volleyball coach (women's national team).
Antonio La Forgia, 77, Italian politician, president of Emilia-Romagna (1996–1999) and of the Emilia-Romagna Legislative Assembly (2000–2005), deputy (2006–2013).
Richard Lewis, 86, English Anglican priest, dean of Wells (1990–2003).
Väinö Markkanen, 93, Finnish sports shooter, Olympic champion (1964), heart attack.
François Meyer, 88, French brigadier general.
Sharon Oster, 73, American economist and academic administrator (Yale School of Management), cancer.
Richard Prosser, 55, New Zealand politician, MP (2011–2017).
Kazimierz Rynkowski, 88, Polish politician and lawyer, mayor of Gdańsk (1981–1989).
David C. Schwartz, 83, American politician, member of the New Jersey General Assembly (1978–1992).
Jorge Spedaletti, 74, Argentine-born Chilean footballer (Universidad de Chile, Everton, national team).
Joe Staton, 74, American baseball player (Detroit Tigers).
Nils Thornander, 64, Swedish-born French visual artist and music composer.
Shelby G. Tilford, 85, American atmospheric spectroscopist.
Sotirios Trambas, 92, Greek Orthodox prelate, metropolitan of Korea (2004–2008).
Aarno Turpeinen, 51, Finnish footballer (OTP, HJK, national team).
Pravin Varaiya, 82, American electrical engineer and academician (University of California, Berkeley).
Heinz Wolfram, 87, German Olympic speed skater (1960).

11
Bernd Bransch, 77, German footballer (HFC Chemie, FC Carl Zeiss Jena, East Germany national team), Olympic champion (1976).
Michel Cosson, 90, French businessman, president of Automobile Club de l'Ouest (1992–2003).
Hilary Devey, 65, English businesswoman and television personality (Dragons' Den).
Igor Dudinsky, 75, Russian artist and art critic.
Hein Eersel, 100, Surinamese academic administrator, chancellor of the University of Suriname (1968–1988).
Stanislav Fišer, 90, Czech actor (Lost Children, Nesmrtelná teta, Andělská tvář) and voice actor.
Tarek Al-Ghoussein, 60, Kuwaiti visual and performance artist.
Janet De Gore, 91, American actress (The Law and Mr. Jones, The Real McCoys, Colonel Humphrey Flack).
Duncan Hannah, 69, American visual artist, heart attack.
Josh Jensen, 77, American winemaker.
Osayomore Joseph, 69, Nigerian musician.
Yuri Mamonov, 64, Russian politician, deputy (2000–2003). (body discovered on this date)
Sikandar Ali Mandhro, 78, Pakistani politician, senator (since 2018) and Sindh MPA (1993–1999, 2002–2018), kidney cancer.
Ravi Paranjape, 86, Indian painter and illustrator.
Vitaly Prilukov, 83, Russian military officer and politician, member of the Supreme Soviet of Russia (1990–1993).
Peter Reusse, 81, German actor (The Adventures of Werner Holt, Denk bloß nicht, ich heule, Frau Venus und ihr Teufel).
Loretta Rogers, 83, English-born Canadian philanthropist, director of Rogers Communications (since 1979).
Peter Scupham, 89, British poet.
Donald Singer, 67, British clinical pharmacologist, president of the Fellowship of Postgraduate Medicine.
Kumiko Takizawa, 69, Japanese voice actress (Tetsujin 28-go, Ojamajo Doremi, Wedding Peach), heart attack.

12
Gabe Baltazar, 92, American jazz alto saxophonist and woodwind doubler.
Edward T. Begay, 87, American politician, speaker of the Navajo Nation Council (1999–2003).
Phil Bennett, 73, Welsh rugby union player (Barbarians, Llanelli, national team).
Patrick Breuzé, 69, French journalist and writer.
Roman Bunka, 70, German oud player and composer, cancer.
H. T. Chen, 74, Chinese-American dancer and choreographer.
Frederick Cuming, 92, English landscape painter.
Roger Dadoun, 94, French philosopher and academic.
Alain Dupas, 76, French astronomer and astrophysicist.
Wale Fanu, 72, Nigerian film producer.
Robert O. Fisch, 97, Hungarian-born American pediatrician, artist, and author.
Jeffery Gifford, 75, American politician, member of the Maine House of Representatives (2006–2014, since 2020), cancer.
Sylvie Granger, French historian.
Philip Baker Hall, 90, American actor (Magnolia, Zodiac, Rush Hour), emphysema.
Heidi Horten, 81, Austrian art collector.
Kim Hak-song, 69, South Korean politician, MP (2000–2012).
Vello Lään, 85, Estonian sport journalist, writer, and radio broadcaster.
Gerhard Lehmbruch, 94, German political scientist.
Helga Lopez, 69, German politician, MP (2005–2009).
Kurt Markus, 75, American photographer, complications from Parkinson's disease and Lewy body dementia.
Věslav Michalik, 59, Czech politician, mayor of Dolní Břežany (since 2004).
Dawit Nega, 34, Ethiopian singer and musician.
D. Philip, 79, Indian actor and film producer (Kolangal).
Lukas Poklepović, 77, Croatian footballer (Hajduk Split, Beveren).
Hunter Reynolds, 62, American visual artist and AIDS activist, squamous cell carcinoma.
Miryam Romero, 59, Spanish journalist and television presenter, leukemia.
Jim Ryan, 76, American politician, attorney general of Illinois (1995–2003).
Terry Sanderson, 75, British secularist and gay rights activist, bladder cancer.
Meghan Stabile, 39, American music promoter, suicide.
Jacques Villain, 88, French physician.
Mitsugu Watanabe, 94, Japanese politician, MP (1979–1983).
Buster Welch, 94, American cutting horse trainer.
Yu Chongwen, 98, Chinese geochemist, member of the Chinese Academy of Sciences.

13
Gloria Allen, 76, American transgender activist, respiratory failure.
Franklin Anangonó, 47, Ecuadorian football player (El Nacional, national team) and manager (Allianza Cotopaxi).
Gérard Bonal, 81, French writer and biographer.
Noel Campbell, 72, Irish footballer (Fortuna Köln, St Patrick's Athletic, Shamrock Rovers).
Hari Chand, 69, Indian Olympic long-distance runner (1976, 1980).
Melody Currey, 71, American politician, member of the Connecticut House of Representatives (1993–2006).
Nikolaos Deligiorgis, 85, Greek magazine editor and publisher.
Cosimo Di Lauro, 48, Italian mobster (Di Lauro clan).
Volker Duschner, 76, German Olympic fencer (1968, 1972).
Alexander G. Fraser, 85, British-American computer scientist. 
Henri Garcin, 94, Belgian actor (Someone Behind the Door, Verdict, The Pink Panther).
Theresia Haidlmayr, 66, Austrian politician and disability rights activist, MP (1994–2008).
Maureen Hiron, 80, British games designer (Continuo) and bridge player.
Ron Hope, 68, British police officer. (death announced on this date)
Marina Lambraki-Plaka, 83, Greek historian, archaeologist, and academic, director of the National Gallery (1992–2022).
Julio Lencina, 83, Argentine cinematographer and producer (Verónico Cruz).
Martha Levisman, 89, Argentine architect and historian.
Anatoly Mikhaylov, 85, Russian hurdler, Olympic bronze medalist (1964).
Akeem Omolade, 39, Nigerian footballer (Treviso, Torino, Novara).
Carlos Ortiz, 85, Puerto Rican Hall of Fame boxer, world super lightweight (1959–1960) and WBA/WBC lightweight champion (1962–1965, 1965–1968).
Giuseppe Pericu, 84, Italian politician, deputy (1994–1996), mayor of Genoa (1997–2007).
John Rigby, 79, Australian swimmer, Olympic bronze medallist (1960).
Rolando Serrano, 83, Colombian footballer (Cúcuta Deportivo, América de Cali, national team).
Georges Weill, 88, French archivist and historian.

14
Bill Ashurst, 74, English rugby league footballer (Wigan, Penrith Panthers, Great Britain national team) and coach.
Arshad Ayub, 93, Malaysian academician and educator.
Abd al-Karim Barjas, Iraqi politician, governor of Anbar (2003–2004).
Rodrigo Orlando Cabrera Cuéllar, 84, Salvadoran Roman Catholic prelate, bishop of Santiago de María (1983–2016).
Johan Cullberg, 88, Swedish psychiatry professor.
Gabino Díaz Merchán, 96, Spanish Roman Catholic prelate, bishop of Guadix (1965–1969) and archbishop of Oviedo (1969–2002).
Hermann Fillitz, 98, Austrian art historian.
Mary Griffin, 96, American politician, member of the New Hampshire House of Representatives (since 1996).
Gene Kenney, 94, American soccer coach (Michigan State Spartans).
Dalimil Klapka, 89, Czech actor.
Aleksander Mackiewicz, 77, Polish politician and economist, minister of internal market (1989–1991).
Missill, 42, French disc jockey, cancer.
Bearcat Murray, 89, Canadian Hall of Fame athletic trainer (Calgary Flames).
Everett Peck, 71, American animator (Duckman, Squirrel Boy, The Critic), complications from pancreatic cancer.
Simon Perchik, 98, American poet.
Ondrej Rigo, 66, Slovak serial killer and necrophile.
Femi Soyinka, 85, Nigerian dermatologist.
Vladimir Stepanov, 95, Russian politician and diplomat, ambassador to Finland (1973–1979), first secretary of the Karelian Regional Committee (1984–1989).
Joel Whitburn, 82, American author and music historian (Billboard).
Davie Wilson, 85, Scottish football player (Rangers, Dundee United, national team) and manager.
A. B. Yehoshua, 85, Israeli writer (The Lover, A Late Divorce), cancer.

15
Maureen Arthur, 88, American actress (How to Succeed in Business Without Really Trying, The Love God?, A Man Called Dagger).
Jim Boyer, 71, American sound engineer (Billy Joel).
Chang Wen-i, 73, Taiwanese politician, member of the Legislative Yuan (1993–2002).
Cho Min-ho, 35, South Korean ice hockey player (Anyang Halla, 2018 Olympic team), lung cancer.
Juan Pablo Echeverri, 43, Colombian artist, malaria.
Friedrich Haag, 91, German politician, member of the Landtag of Baden-Württemberg (1967–1992).
Udo Hild, 79, German Olympic rower (1968, 1972).
Jay Hopler, 51, American poet, prostate cancer.
Jan Klijnjan, 77, Dutch footballer (Sparta Rotterdam, Sochaux, national team).
Enda McGowan, 75, Irish Gaelic footballer (Cavan, Ulster).
Kazue Morisaki, 95, Japanese poet and writer, respiratory failure.
Gopi Chand Narang, 91, Indian literary critic.
Frederick Nolan, 91, British writer and editor.
Philippe Nozières, 90, French physicist.
Moss O'Connell, 87, Irish Gaelic footballer and hurler (Abbeydorney GAA, Kerry GAA).
John Parkes, 83, English cricketer (Free Foresters) and army officer.
Gordon Peters, 95, English actor (Dad's Army, Are You Being Served?, One Foot in the Grave).
Arnold Skolnick, 85, American graphic artist (Woodstock).
Peter Scott-Morgan, 64, English-American roboticist, complications from motor neurone disease.
Tauno Timoska, 90, Finnish Olympic field hockey player (1952).
K. K. Veerappan, 77, Indian politician, Tamil Nadu MLA (1996–2001).
Sikota Wina, 90, Zambian politician, minister of health (1964) and information (1968–1973) and three-time MP.

16
Don Allen, 84, American golfer.
Steinar Amundsen, 76, Norwegian sprint canoeist, Olympic champion (1968).
Artigas Barrios, 84, Uruguayan politician, deputy (2000–2005) and intendant of Rocha Department (2005–2015), pneumonia.
Big Rude Jake, 57, Canadian musician, small-cell carcinoma.
Tony Boskovic, 89, Australian soccer referee.
John Sears Casey, 91, American politician, member of the Alabama House of Representatives (1959–1967).
García Castany, 73, Spanish footballer (Barcelona, Zaragoza).
Maria Lúcia Dahl, 80, Brazilian actress (Macunaíma).
Michel David-Weill, 89, American investment banker, chairman of Lazard (1977–2001).
Yuri Fedotov, 74, Russian politician, deputy minister of foreign affairs (2002–2005), ambassador to the UK (2005–2010) and executive director of the UNODC (2010–2019).
Ivonne Haza, 83, Dominican operatic soprano (Eduardo Brito National Theater).
M. Henry Jones, 65, American artist and filmmaker.
Michael Stephen Kanne, 83, American jurist, judge on the U.S. Court of Appeals for the Seventh Circuit (since 1987).
Ken Knowlton, 91, American computer scientist and artist, inventor of BEFLIX.
Peter Mackridge, 76, British Hellenist and historian.
Antonio Montero Moreno, 93, Spanish Roman Catholic prelate and journalist, bishop of Badajoz (1980–1994) and archbishop of Mérida-Badajoz (1994–2004).
Don Neely, 86, New Zealand cricket historian, player (Wellington, Auckland) and administrator, president of New Zealand Cricket (2006–2009).
Mike Pratt, 73, American basketball player (Kentucky Colonels), coach (Charlotte 49ers), and sportscaster (Kentucky Wildcats), colon cancer.
Tim Sale, 66, American comic book artist (Batman: The Long Halloween, Batman: Dark Victory, Superman for All Seasons), kidney failure.
Tyler Sanders, 18, American actor (Just Add Magic: Mystery City), accidental fentanyl overdose.
Vittorio Sega, 87, Italian politician, senator (1979–1987).
Lexie Tynan, 89, Irish Olympic sprinter (1952).
Rino Vernizzi, 75, Italian bassoonist.
Gary Witherspoon, 78, American anthropologist.

17
Muzamil Abdullayev, 80–81, Azerbaijani winemaker and politician, minister of food and agriculture (1993–1994).
Bakht Baidar, 72, Pakistani politician, member of the Khyber Pakhtunkhwa Assembly (since 2013), cardiac arrest.
Manuel Bennett, 100, American artist.
Flavio Roberto Carraro, 90, Italian Roman Catholic prelate, bishop of Arezzo-Cortona-Sansepolcro (1996–1998) and Verona (1998–2007).
Damian Casey, 29, Irish hurler (Eoghan Ruadh, Dungannon, Tyrone).
Rosemary Catacalos, 78, American poet, cancer.
Gary Collins, 86, Canadian ice hockey player (Toronto Maple Leafs).
Sid Ahmed Ferroukhi, 54, Algerian politician, deputy (2017–2019), cardiac arrest.
Ray Greene, 83, American college football player and coach (Jacksonville Sharks, North Carolina Central, Alabama A&M).
Dave Hebner, 73, American professional wrestling referee and manager (WWE, TNA).
Sigurd Hofmann, 78, German physicist.
Eiko Kaneta, 79, Japanese politician, member of the House of Representatives (1993–2005).
Ahmad Mahdavi Damghani, 95, Iranian literary scholar.
Hugh McElhenny, 93, American Hall of Fame football player (San Francisco 49ers, Minnesota Vikings, New York Giants).
John Mountford, 88, Australian politician, MP (1980–1990).
Bruno Pedron, 78, Italian Roman Catholic prelate, bishop of Jardim (1999–2007) and Ji-Paraná (2007–2019).
W.T.P. Simarmata, 67, Indonesian politician, senator (since 2019).
Malcolm Skilbeck, 89, Australian educator, vice-chancellor of Deakin University (1986–1991).
Wilson Stone, 69, American politician, member of the Kentucky House of Representatives (2009–2021).
Marlenka Stupica, 94, Slovenian children's book illustrator.
Nicole Tomczak-Jaegermann, 77, Polish-Canadian mathematician.
Jean-Louis Trintignant, 91, French actor (A Man and a Woman, Z, Amour), director and racecar driver.
Valentin Uritescu, 81, Romanian actor (The Conjugal Bed, The Last Assault, Sand Cliffs), complications from Parkinson's disease.
Ken Williams, 83, American songwriter ("Everybody Plays the Fool").
Lynn Wright, 69, American politician, member of the Mississippi House of Representatives (since 2020), complications from amyotrophic lateral sclerosis.
Zhang Siqing, 89, Chinese politician, vice chairperson of the CPPCC (1998–2008) and procurator-general (1993–1998).

18
Hans-Dieter Bader, 84, German operatic tenor (Staatsoper Hannover).
Pierre Baldi, 103, French painter.
Giorgio Barbolini, 88, Italian footballer (Reggiana, Roma, Padova).
Alberto Bozzato, 92, Italian Olympic rower (1952).
Clair Branch, 85, American football player (Saskatchewan Roughriders, Edmonton Eskimos).
David Cervantes, 62, Mexican politician, deputy (1997–2000).
Mariano Díez Moreno, 72, Spanish politician, deputy (1983–1987), president of the Provincial Deputation of Toledo (1987–1991).
Constantin Eftimescu, 70, Romanian footballer (Dinamo București, Victoria București, Delta Tulcea).
René-Nicolas Ehni, 87, French writer and playwright.
Anita Ekström, 79, Swedish actress (Jänken, A Handful of Love, Children's Island).
Uffe Ellemann-Jensen, 80, Danish politician, minister of foreign affairs (1982–1993), prostate cancer.
Gian Pietro Felisatti, 72, Italian music producer, composer, and songwriter ("Il mare calmo della sera", "Sei bellissima").
Marie-Rose Gaillard, 77, Belgian racing cyclist.
Werner Heine, 85, German footballer (BFC Dynamo, 1. FC Union Berlin, East Germany national team).
Chuck MacNeil, 77, Canadian politician, Nova Scotia MLA (1984–1993).
Adibah Noor, 51, Malaysian singer and actress (Mukhsin, Talentime, Crayon), ovarian cancer.
Aleksei Parshin, 79, Russian mathematician.
Nelson Proença, 71, Brazilian businessman and politician, deputy (1991–2011).
Lennie Rosenbluth, 89, American basketball player (Philadelphia Warriors).
Rémi Sainte-Marie, 84, Canadian Roman Catholic prelate, bishop of Dedza (2000–2006) and archbishop of Lilongwe (2007–2013).
Mamadou Sarr, 83, Senegalese Olympic sprinter (1968).
Wilma Schmidt, 95, German operatic soprano (Staatsoper Hannover).
Mark Shields, 85, American political commentator (PBS NewsHour, Capital Gang, Inside Washington), kidney failure.
Ilka Soares, 89, Brazilian actress (Iracema), lung cancer.
Anne F. Sutton, 79–80, British historian.
Ronnie Theseira, 92, Malaysian Olympic fencer (1964).
Dave Wickersham, 86, American baseball player (Kansas City Athletics, Detroit Tigers, Pittsburgh Pirates).

19
Gennady Burbulis, 76, Russian politician, first deputy prime minister (1991–1992) and MP (1994–2007).
Wim Dik, 83, Dutch politician and businessman, state secretary for economic affairs (1981–1982).
Charlotte Furth, 88, American historian and scholar.
Ken Fyffe, 84, Australian footballer (North Melbourne).
Colin Grainger, 89, English footballer (Sheffield United, Sunderland, national team).
José García Pérez, 86, Spanish writer and politician, deputy (1977–1982), cancer.
Ritzi Jacobi, 80, Romanian textile artist.
Leonie Kotelawala, 78, Sri Lankan actress (Ekamath Eka Rateka).
Oleh Kutsyn, 56, Ukrainian military officer, shot.
J. H. A. Lokin, 77, Dutch law professor.
Donald McCurdy, 92, American politician, member of the Pennsylvania House of Representatives (1967–1974).
Carol Raye, 99, British-Australian actress (Strawberry Roan, Waltz Time, Green Fingers).
Clela Rorex, 78, American civil servant, issued first same-sex marriage license, complications from surgery.
Jim Schwall, 79, American blues musician (Siegel–Schwall Band).
Noriyuki Sekine, 91, Japanese politician, councillor (1991–1998).
Stephen Sinatra, 75, American cardiologist.
Thalis Tsirimokos, 62, Greek football player (PAS Giannina, OFI) and manager (Ethnikos Piraeus).
Brett Tuggle, 70, American keyboardist (Fleetwood Mac, David Lee Roth) and songwriter ("Just Like Paradise"), cancer.
Bob Turner, 87, American politician, member of the Texas House of Representatives (1991–2003).
Luigino Vascon, 65, Italian politician, deputy (1996–2006).
Tim White, 68, American professional wrestling referee (WWE).

20
Regimantas Adomaitis, 85, Lithuanian actor (Feelings, Faktas, The Trust That Went Bust).
Mohiuddin Ahmed, 78, Bangladeshi diplomat.
Alphonse Allain, 97, French poet.
Sture Allén, 93, Swedish linguist, permanent secretary of the Swedish Academy (1986–1999).
Paul Angstadt, 83, American politician, member of the Pennsylvania House of Representatives (1983–1992) and mayor of Reading, Pennsylvania (1996–2000).
Jordi Bonet i Armengol, 97, Spanish architect, construction manager of the Sagrada Família (1987–2012).
James M. Bardeen, 83, American physicist.
Dennis Cahill, 68, American guitarist (The Gloaming).
Liam Cahill, 72, Irish civil servant and journalist.
James Drees, 91, American politician, member of the Iowa House of Representatives (1995–2001).
Paul M. Ellwood Jr., 95, American pediatrician.
Kurt Equiluz, 93, Austrian operatic tenor (Vienna State Opera).
Stefan Geosits, 94, Austrian Roman Catholic priest and historian.
Thomas O'Riordan, 84, Irish Olympic long-distance runner (1964).
Gianmario Pellizzari, 77, Italian farmer and politician, deputy (1976–1992).
Mauricio Quiroga, 30, Argentine racing cyclist, suicide.
Eldar Salayev, 88, Azerbaijani physician, president of the Azerbaijan National Academy of Sciences (1983–1997).
Aang Hamid Suganda, 79, Indonesian politician, regent of Kuningan (2003–2013).
Caleb Swanigan, 25, American basketball player (Purdue Boilermakers, Portland Trail Blazers, Sacramento Kings).
Józef Walaszczyk, 102, Polish leatherworker and businessman.
Xiong Qingquan, 94, Chinese politician, governor of Hunan (1985–1989) and delegate to the NPC (1988–1993).

21
Ernest Abuba, 74, American actor (12 Monkeys, King of New York, Article 99).
Sir Peter Barter, 82, Australian-born Papua New Guinean businessman and politician, governor of Madang Province (1997–2002).
J. R. Bishop, 84, American football coach (Wheaton Thunder).
Patrizia Cavalli, 75, Italian poet.
Harvey Dinnerstein, 94, American figurative artist.
Jaylon Ferguson, 26, American football player (Baltimore Ravens, Louisiana Tech Bulldogs), accidental drug overdose.
Pedro Gallina, 73, Argentine footballer (Ferro Carril Oeste, Lota Schwager, Everton).
Erich Heckelmann, 87, German politician, member of the Landtag of North Rhine-Westphalia (1978–1980, 1981–1996).
Duncan Henderson, 72, American film producer (Master and Commander: The Far Side of the World, Oblivion, Space Jam: A New Legacy), pancreatic cancer.
Artie Kane, 93, American pianist, film score composer (Eyes of Laura Mars, Night of the Juggler, Wrong Is Right) and conductor.
Franklin B. Mann, 81, American politician, member of the Florida House of Representatives (1974–1982) and senate (1982–1986).
Pierre Narcisse, 45, Cameroonian-born Russian singer and actor (The Barber of Siberia), complications from kidney surgery.
Brig Owens, 79, American football player (Dallas Cowboys, Washington Redskins).
Birgit Pohl, 68, German athlete, Paralympic champion (1996, 2000).
Chantal Poupaud, French film director, producer, and screenwriter (Seventh Heaven, Under the Sand).
David Pugh, British actor (Loving Memory, Burke & Hare, The Sex Thief). (death announced on this date)
James Rado, 90, American actor (Lions Love), playwright and composer (Hair), Grammy winner (1969).
Nikos Salikas, 81, Greek politician, MP (1989–1993).
Jaroslav Škarvan, 78, Czech handball player, Olympic silver medalist (1972).
Dragan Tomić, 86, Serbian politician, acting president (1997), president of the National Assembly (1994–2001).
Alipasha Umalatov, 95, Russian politician, leader of the Dagestan ASSR (1967–1978).
Polycarpose Zacharias, 51, Indian Jacobite Syrian Orthodox prelate, metropolitan of the Church (since 2012), heart attack.

22
Patrick Adams, 72, American record producer, music arranger and composer (The Universal Robot Band, Musique).
Xhevdet Bajraj, 62, Kosovar poet and screenwriter, lung cancer.
Jimmy Bryant, 93, American singer.
Marilu Bueno, 82, Brazilian actress (Better Days Ahead, Lua de Cristal, The Man of the Year), complications from abdominal surgery.
Yves Coppens, 87, French anthropologist (Lucy).
L. Patrick Devlin, 83, American lecturer and author.
Paulo Diniz, 82, Brazilian singer.
Clovis Gagnon, 96, Canadian politician, Quebec MNA (1953–1960).
Donald Gemmell, 89, New Zealand Olympic rower (1956).
Alec Head, 97, French racehorse trainer and breeder.
Alexander Jefferson, 100, American Air Force officer (Tuskegee Airmen).
Robert A. Katz, 79, American film and television producer (Gettysburg, Selena, Introducing Dorothy Dandridge), lung cancer.
Danuza Leão, 88, Brazilian actress (Entranced Earth), journalist (Folha de S.Paulo) and writer, respiratory failure.
Willie Morrow, 82, American businessman and inventor (afro pick).
Jonny Nilsson, 79, Swedish speed skater, Olympic champion (1964).
Gerd Grønvold Saue, 92, Norwegian writer.
Tony Siragusa, 55, American football player (Indianapolis Colts, Baltimore Ravens), television host (Man Caves) and actor.
Bruton Smith, 95, American Hall of Fame motorsports promoter (Speedway Motorsports).
Bernie Stolar, 75, American video game industry executive, president of Mattel (1999–2005).
Jüri Tarmak, 75, Estonian high jumper, Olympic champion (1972).
Graham Tutt, 65, English footballer (Charlton Athletic, Atlanta Chiefs, Georgia Generals).
Gerardo Clemente Vega, 82, Mexican military officer, secretary of national defence (2000–2006).
Carlos Vera, 93, Chilean Olympic athlete (1948, 1952).

23
Rex Austin, 91, New Zealand politician, MP (1975–1987).
Bernard Belle, 57, American musician, music producer and songwriter ("I Like the Way (The Kissing Game)", "Remember the Time").
Gianpaolo Bissi, 81, Italian politician, senator (1987–1992).
Henri Elendé, 80, Congolese Olympic high jumper (1964).
Ernane Galvêas, 99, Brazilian economist and politician, president of the Central Bank of Brazil (1968–1974, 1979–1980), minister of economy (1980–1985).
Arkady Gartsman, 75, Ukrainian songwriter (Treasure Island), screenwriter and actor.
Sally Greengross, Baroness Greengross, 86, British politician, member of the House of Lords (since 2000).
Ernst Jacobi, 88, German actor (The Big Chance, The Day the Rains Came, The Tin Drum).
Stien Kaiser, 84, Dutch speed skater, Olympic champion (1972).
Ko Tin Lung, 69, Hong Kong actor (July Rhapsody), film producer (I Have a Date with Spring) and presenter.
Liang Junwu, 88, Chinese materials scientist, member of the Chinese Academy of Sciences.
Ove Malmberg, 89, Swedish Olympic ice hockey player (1956).
Rima Melati, 84, Indonesian actress (Laki-Laki Tak Bernama, Wadjah Seorang Laki-laki, Max Havelaar).
Peter Molnar, 78, American geophysicist.
Massimo Morante, 69, Italian guitarist (Goblin).
Tommy Morgan, 89, American harmonica player.
Alain Plantefol, 79, French rugby union player (Racing 92, SU Agen, national team).
Leo Posada, 88, Cuban baseball player (Kansas City Athletics), pancreatic cancer.
Yuri Shatunov, 48, Russian singer (Laskovyi Mai), heart attack.
Soon Cho, 94, South Korean politician, MP (1998–2000).
John F. Stack, 71, American political scientist.
Paula Stafford, 102, Australian fashion designer.
Francis Tulloch, 81, Jamaican politician, two-time MP and minister of tourism (1997–1999).
Mahmut Ustaosmanoğlu, 93, Turkish Islamic scholar, imam of İsmailağa (1954–1996), infection.
Joan van der Waals, 102, Dutch physicist.
Leluț Vasilescu, 66, Romanian drummer.
Jean Waline, 88, French academic and politician.
Chumei Watanabe, 96, Japanese composer (Mazinger Z, Steel Jeeg), heart failure.

24
Edward Abramoski, 88, American athletic trainer (Buffalo Bills).
Neil Chandler, 73, Australian footballer (Carlton, St Kilda).
Suzanne Deuchler, 92, American politician, member of the Illinois House of Representatives (1981–1999).
Finn Døssing, 81, Danish footballer (Viborg, Dundee United, Aalborg).
Harry Gration, 71, English journalist and broadcaster (Look North).
Ulf Lönnqvist, 85, Swedish politician, minister for sports, youth and tourism (1986–1989) and housing (1988–1991).
Lawrence Moss, 94, American composer.
Bruce Nelson, 81, American historian, Lewy body dementia.
Fatikh Sibagatullin, 72, Russian politician, deputy (2007–2021).
Nathan Sivin, 91, American linguist and historian.
Janna Thompson, 79, American-born Australian philosopher and ethicist.
Zhang Sizhi, 94, Chinese human rights activist.

25
Michael Baker-Harber, 76, British Olympic sailor (1976).
Bill Bell, 74, American football player (Atlanta Falcons, New England Patriots).
Javier Cárdenas, 69, Mexican footballer (Deportivo Toluca, Guadalajara, national team).
Peter Denz, 82, German engineer, inventor and entrepreneur.
Sam Gilliam, 88, American painter, kidney failure.
Alberto Gurrola, 29, Mexican footballer (Lobos BUAP, Cimarrones de Sonora).
Louis Ken-Kwofie, 53, Ghanaian football player (New York Red Bulls) and manager (Ramapo College), pancreatic cancer.
John Leefe, 80, Canadian politician, Nova Scotia MHA (1978–1999).
John Manningham-Buller, 2nd Viscount Dilhorne, 90, English hereditary peer and barrister.
Elena Marttila, 99, Russian painter.
Christine McElwee, 75, New Zealand politician and historian.
Arie Pais, 92, Dutch politician, senator (1977, 1981–1982) and minister of education and sciences (1977–1981).
Dietmar Streitler, 58, Austrian Olympic wrestler (1984).
Russell Watt, 86, New Zealand rugby union footballer (Otago, Wellington, national team).
Kim Weber, 76, Finnish Olympic sailor (1972).
Bernhard Wessel, 85, German footballer (Borussia Dortmund).
Bill Woolsey, 87, American swimmer, Olympic champion (1952).

26
Thomas Bewley, 95, British-Irish psychiatrist.
Thue Christiansen, 82, Greenlandic visual artist and politician, designer of the flag of Greenland and minister of education (1979–1983).
Don Cullen, 89, Canadian actor, comedian and writer.
Yuri Gorobets, 90, Russian actor (Come Tomorrow, Please..., Investigation Held by ZnaToKi, Air Crew).
Paul Hartnett, 94, American politician, member of the Nebraska Legislature (1985–2005).
Hans Hollmann, 89, Austrian director and actor.
Bruce R. Katz, 75, American entrepreneur (Rockport), injuries sustained in a fall.
Margaret Keane, 94, American painter, subject of Big Eyes, heart failure.
Jerzy Kopa, 79, Polish football player and manager (Stal Stalowa Wola, Lech Poznań, Pogoń Szczecin).
V. Krishnamurthy, 97, Indian civil servant.
Raffaele La Capria, 99, Italian writer and screenwriter (Hands over the City, Many Wars Ago).
Abraham Lavender, 81, American sociologist.
Mary Mara, 61, American actress (Nash Bridges, ER, A Civil Action), drowned.
Timothy J. McCann, 78, English archivist.
Frank Moorhouse, 83, Australian author (Dark Palace, Cold Light) and screenwriter (The Coca-Cola Kid).
Frank Williams, 90, English actor (The Army Game, Dad's Army, You Rang, M'Lord?).

27
Renato Ascencio León, 83, Mexican Roman Catholic prelate, territorial prelate of Madera (1988–1994) and bishop of Ciudad Juárez (1994–2014).
Sir Colin Blakemore, 78, British neurobiologist.
Marlin Briscoe, 76, American football player (Buffalo Bills, Miami Dolphins, Denver Broncos), pneumonia.
Leonardo Del Vecchio, 87, Italian eyewear industry executive, founder of Luxottica, pneumonia.
Albert Derrick, 82, English footballer (Hereford United), throat cancer.
Mildred Reason Dube, Zimbabwean politician, senator (since 2018).
Fina García Marruz, 99, Cuban poet.
Jack Gordon, 94, Canadian ice hockey general manager (Minnesota North Stars, Vancouver Canucks), coach and player (New York Rangers).
Fred Hyatt, 75, American football player (St. Louis Cardinals, New Orleans Saints, Washington Redskins), complications from heart surgery.
Giles Mutsekwa, 73, Zimbabwean politician, minister of home affairs (2009–2013).
Teruyoshi Nakano, 86, Japanese special effects artist (Godzilla vs. Hedorah, Zone Fighter, Princess from the Moon), sepsis.
Nick Nemeroff, 32, Canadian comedian.
Jay Octeau, 57, American ice hockey player (Boston University Terriers).
Michael C. Stenger, 71, American law enforcement officer, sergeant at arms of the United States Senate (2018–2021).
Mats Traat, 85, Estonian poet and writer.
Joe Turkel, 94, American actor (The Shining, Blade Runner, Paths of Glory), liver failure.
Wu Jin-yun, 84, Taiwanese Olympic athlete (1960).

28
Cüneyt Arkın, 84, Turkish actor (The Mine, Dünyayı Kurtaran Adam, Paramparça), film director, and producer, cardiac arrest.
Martin Bangemann, 87, German politician, MP (1972–1980, 1987–1989) and federal minister of economics of West Germany (1984–1988).
Christine Dranzoa, 55, Ugandan academic administrator and biologist.
Dennis Egan, 75, American broadcaster (KINY) and politician, member of the Alaska Senate (2009–2019) and mayor of Juneau (1995–2000).
Neville Hayes, 78, Australian swimmer, Olympic silver medalist (1960).
Katja Husen, 46, Turkish-born German biologist and politician, member of the Hamburg Parliament (2004–2008), traffic collision.
Dame Deborah James, 40, English journalist (You, Me and the Big C), bowel cancer.
Gary Jerke, 74, American politician, member of the South Dakota House of Representatives (2005–2008).
Sergey Korepanov, 74, Russian politician.
Ian Verner Macdonald, 97, Canadian trade diplomat and entrepreneur.
T. Sivadasa Menon, 90, Indian politician, Kerala MLA (1987–2001).
Pallonji Mistry, 93, Indian-born Irish businessman, chairman of the Shapoorji Pallonji Group.
Malcolm Neesam, 76, English historian and writer.
Hichem Rostom, 75, Tunisian actor (The English Patient, The Magic Box, The Flower of Aleppo).
Asao Sano, 96, Japanese actor (Season of the Sun, The Last Samurai, The Funeral).
Ryuzo Sasaki, 65, Japanese politician, MP (1993–2000, 2005–2012), heart attack.
Scope, 4, Irish racehorse, euthanised.
Mike Schuler, 81, American basketball coach (Portland Trail Blazers, Los Angeles Clippers).
Varinder Singh, 75, Indian field hockey player, Olympic bronze medallist (1972).
Rolf Skoglund, 81, Swedish actor (Vi hade i alla fall tur med vädret, Fångarna på fortet, Jönssonligan spelar högt), cancer.
John Visentin, 59, American business executive, CEO of Xerox (since 2018).
Kaiwan Wattanakrai, 71, Thai voice actor.
Dennis Wilson, 101, British war poet.

29
Bill Allen, 85, American businessman, CEO of VECO Corporation.
Sonny Barger, 83, American biker, author and actor (Sons of Anarchy), co-founder of the Hells Angels, cancer.
Kenward Elmslie, 93, American poet.
David Weiss Halivni, 94, Israeli-American rabbi.
Manikavagasam Harichandra, 91, Malaysian Olympic middle-distance runner (1956).
Alfredo Hernández Raigosa, 59, Mexican politician and social activist, deputy (2000–2003).
Neil Kerley, 88, Australian footballer (West Adelaide, South Adelaide, Glenelg), traffic collision.
Manfred Krafft, 84, German football player (Fortuna Düsseldorf) and manager (Karlsruher SC, FC Kaiserslautern).
Eeles Landström, 90, Finnish pole vaulter and politician, MP (1966–1972), Olympic bronze medalist (1960).
Peter B. Lowry, 81, American folklorist, musicologist, and record label owner (Trix Records).
María Rosa de Madariaga, 85, Spanish historian.
Yehuda Meshi Zahav, 62, Israeli social activist, co-founder of ZAKA, suicide by hanging.
Agate Nesaule, 84, Latvian-born American author (A Woman in Amber).
Jim Pappin, 82, Canadian ice hockey player (Toronto Maple Leafs, Chicago Blackhawks, California Golden Seals), Stanley Cup champion (1964, 1967).
Suzanne Pepper, 83, American-born Hong Kong author and political scientist.
Miklós Szabó, 93, Hungarian Olympic long-distance runner (1956, 1960).
Hershel W. Williams, 98, American Marine Corps warrant officer, Medal of Honor recipient (1945).
Anthony M. Villane, 92, American politician, member of the New Jersey General Assembly (1976–1988).

30
Rolando Andaya Jr., 53, Filipino politician, secretary of budget and management (2006–2010), twice member and deputy speaker (2016–2018) of the House of Representatives.
Marcus Fairs, 54, British magazine editor, founder of Dezeen.
Jean-Guy Gendron, 87, Canadian ice hockey player (Philadelphia Flyers, New York Rangers, Boston Bruins), assisted suicide.
R. Ross Holloway, 87, American archaeologist.
Tatsuaki Iwata, 96, Japanese Go player, pneumonia.
Satinder Kumar Lambah, 80, Indian diplomat.
Muriel Phillips, 101, American World War II veteran and writer.
Gerald Schweighart, 84, American politician, mayor of Champaign, Illinois (1999–2011).
Bill Squires, 89, American track and field coach (Greater Boston Track Club).
Dmitry Stepushkin, 46, Russian Olympic bobsledder (2002, 2006, 2010).
Indulata Sukla, 78, Indian mathematician.
Technoblade, 23, American YouTuber, sarcoma.  (death announced on this date)
Brian Tomlinson, 81, Australian footballer (South Melbourne).
Vladimir Zelenko, 49, Ukrainian-born American physician, cancer.
Kazimierz Zimny, 87, Polish athlete, Olympic bronze medalist (1960).

References

2022-6
6